Giving You the Best That I Got is the third album by American R&B/soul singer  Anita Baker, released in 1988. It was Baker's first and only #1 Pop album in the US, her second #1 R&B Album, and was certified 3x platinum in 1989 by the RIAA.
The title track was released as the first single from the album and became Baker's highest-charting single in the US, peaking at #3 on the Billboard Hot 100.
The album earned Baker three Grammy Awards and three Soul Train Music Awards.

Track listing
"Priceless" (Garry Glenn) – 5:00
"Lead Me into Love" (Steve Lane, Larry Prentiss) – 4:45
"Giving You the Best That I Got" (Baker, Randy Holland, Skip Scarborough) – 4:18
"Good Love" (Gary Taylor) – 5:39
"Rules" (Graham Lamb, Phil Nicholl, Maggie Ryder) – 3:52
"Good Enough" (Baker, James McBride) – 4:50
"Just Because" (Alex Brown, Sammy McKinney, Michael O'Hara) – 5:13
"You Belong to Me" (Terry Britten, Billy Livsey, Graham Lyle) – 3:50

Critical reception

Alex Henderson of AllMusic rated the album four points out of five, calling it not "on the par with" Baker's previous albums but better than most of R&B albums released in 1988.

Commercial performance
The album has sold over 5 million copies worldwide (including 3 million from the US). peaked at number two in Jet magazine's top 20 for three weeks between February 6 and 20, 1989, and again on the week of March 13, 1989.

It became Baker's first and only number one album on Billboard 200 and her second number-one R&B Album. In March 1989, the album was certified 3× Platinum in 1989 by the RIAA.

Singles
"Just Because" hit number one in Jet magazine's top 20 singles on weeks of March 13, 20, and 27, 1989. The song peaked at number one on the Hot Black Singles, making it Baker's second number one and also made the Top 40, peaking at number fourteen. It has been described as a wedding reception favorite.

"Lead Me into Love" peaked at number six in Jet magazine's top 20 singles on weeks of June 5 and 12, 1989. It peaked at number four on the Hot Black Singles.

Personnel
 Anita Baker – lead vocals, backing vocals (4, 5), BGV arrangements (5)
 Robbie Buchanan – keyboards (1, 2, 5, 7), synthesizer programming (1, 2, 7, 8), string arrangements (7)
 Vernon D. Fails – keyboards (1-4, 6)
 Dave Boruff – synthesizer programming (1, 8), saxophone (8)
 George Duke – acoustic piano (2)
 Bobby Lyle – acoustic piano (2)
 Dean "Sir" Gant – acoustic piano (3, 6)
 Gary Taylor – keyboards (4)
 Joseph Vitarelli – Synclavier (4)
 Peter Schwartz – keyboards (5)
 Bruce Nazarian – Synclavier programming (5)
 Reginald "Sonny" Burke – keyboards (8)
 Patrick Moten – keyboards (8)
 Neal Walker – keyboards (8)
 Paul Jackson Jr. – guitar (1, 2, 5, 7)
 Michael J. Powell – guitar (1, 2, 4, 5, 8), string arrangements (7)
 Donnie Lyle – guitar (4)
 Nathan East – bass (1, 2, 3, 5, 6, 7)
 Omar Hakim – drums (1, 2, 3, 6)
 Paulinho da Costa – percussion (1, 2, 3, 5, 6)
 Gerald Albright – saxophone (6) 
 Courtlen Hale – saxophone (8)
 Chuck Findley – trumpet (8)
 Paul Riser – string arrangements (1, 2)
 Alex Brown – backing vocals (1, 3, 7), BGV arrangements (7)
 Angel Edwards – backing vocals (1, 3)
 Valarie Pinkston Mayo – backing vocals (1, 3), BGV arrangements (1, 3)
 Carol Perry – backing vocals (2), BGV arrangements (2)
 Darlene Perry – backing vocals (2), BGV arrangements (2)
 Lori Perry – backing vocals (2, 7), BGV arrangements (2)
 Sharon Perry – backing vocals (2), BGV arrangements (2)
 Marva King – backing vocals (7)
 Roy Galloway – backing vocals (8)
 Lynne Fiddmont – backing vocals (8)
 Fred White – backing vocals (8)

Production
 Executive Producer – Anita Baker
 Producer – Michael J. Powell
 Production Coordination – Sephra Herman, Tweed and Tominaga.
 A&R – Raoul Roach
 Engineer – Barney Perkins
 Second Engineer – Milton Chan
 Assistant Engineers – Les Cooper, Fred Law, Bruce Nazarian and Tim Purvis.
 Mastered by Bernie Grundman at Bernie Grundman Mastering (Hollywood, CA).
 Art Direction – Carol Bobolts
 Photography – Adrian Buckmaster

Charts

Weekly charts

Year-end charts

Certifications

See also
List of number-one R&B albums of 1988 (U.S.)
List of number-one R&B albums of 1989 (U.S.)
List of number-one albums of 1988 (U.S.)
List of number-one albums of 1989 (U.S.)

References

Anita Baker albums
1988 albums
Elektra Records albums